The 2001–02 NBA season was the Bulls' 36th season in the National Basketball Association. After finishing with the worst record the previous season, the Bulls selected high school basketball star Eddy Curry with the fourth overall pick in the 2001 NBA draft, and acquired top draft pick and high school basketball star Tyson Chandler from the Los Angeles Clippers. During the off-season, the team re-acquired former Bulls forward Charles Oakley from the Toronto Raptors, acquired Greg Anthony from the Portland Trail Blazers, and signed free agents Eddie Robinson, and Kevin Ollie. Oakley had played three seasons for the Bulls from 1985 to 1988. However, the Bulls still struggled losing 23 of their first 27 games, posting a ten-game losing streak in November. Head coach Tim Floyd resigned on Christmas Eve after a 4–21 start to the season, then after two games under assistant Bill Berry, the team hired former Bulls center Bill Cartwright as their new coach. Midway through the season, the Bulls traded Ollie along with Ron Mercer, Ron Artest and Brad Miller to the Indiana Pacers in exchange for Jalen Rose and Travis Best, while Anthony was released to free agency and later on signed with the Milwaukee Bucks. The Bulls struggled all season long finishing last place in the Central Division with a 21–61 record. Rose averaged 23.8 points per game with the team, while second-year forward Marcus Fizer provided them with 12.3 points and 5.6 rebounds per game. Following the season, Oakley signed as a free agent with the Washington Wizards, and Best signed with the Miami Heat. (See 2001–02 Chicago Bulls season#Regular season)

Offseason

NBA Draft

Roster

Regular season

In 2001-02, the make-up and direction of the Chicago Bulls changed significantly: by the season's end, a pair of 18-year-old phenoms and an All-Star caliber player were in the line-up while Elton Brand, once thought to be the franchise's cornerstone for rebuilding efforts, was not. The result was a renewed sense of optimism and hope surrounding the team's future with Tyson Chandler, Eddy Curry and Jalen Rose as the centers of attention.

It all began on the night of the 2001 NBA Draft, when the Bulls used their first-round pick, fourth overall, to select Thornwood High School's Eddy Curry, a 6-11, 285-pound center. Minutes later, Chicago dealt Brand to the L.A. Clippers for Dominguez High School product Tyson Chandler (picked second overall) and Brian Skinner. Chicago also acquired one of the steals of the draft in Trenton Hassell out of Austin Peay in the second round.

With the addition of free agent Eddie Robinson (signed Aug. 7), the new look Bulls, a young and athletic squad, were ready to take the floor. The importance of having NBA experience was again displayed as the team struggled and finished the season 21–61. The beginning of the year was not pleasant for Chicago. The Bulls set a franchise record for worst loss with a 53-point loss to the Minnesota Timberwolves on Nov. 8, Head Coach Tim Floyd, who compiled a 49–190 record over four seasons with the club, resigned on Christmas Eve. Bill Berry was named interim coach and four days later, Bill Cartwright was named head coach on Dec. 28.

The team went on to suffer an 18-game road losing streak from Nov. 2 to Jan. 11. On Feb. 18, the Bulls grabbed a franchise-low 25 rebounds in Miami.

A change was needed and on February 19, it was delivered in the form of a seven-player trade. The Bulls acquired Jalen Rose, Travis Best and Norman Richardson from the Indiana Pacers for Brad Miller, Ron Artest, Ron Mercer and Kevin Ollie.

“We feel Jalen is an outstanding all-around player who can play three positions offensively and defensively,” EVP of Basketball Operations Jerry Krause explained. “He’s a very good passer, extremely unselfish, a fine scorer and in the prime of his career at age 29. His leadership qualities and versatility are an added plus.”

“I'm excited about it,” Rose said upon his arrival to Chicago. “I embrace the opportunity. Every kid dreams about standing in this position talking about having an opportunity to take a team to a championship level.”

The team went on to post their first three-game winning streak in two years from Feb. 20–23. Jamal Crawford, who tore his ACL over the summer and required surgery to repair it, returned to the active roster on March 3 after missing the first 58 games of the season. On March 11, the Bulls and Bill Cartwright mutually agreed to a three-year extension on the head coach's contract. Other notes from the season included Marcus Fizer’s (sophomore team) participation in the Schick Rookie Challenge at All-Star Weekend and Trenton Hassell being named to the NBA’s ‘got milk?’ Rookie of the Month for February.

Season standings

Record vs. opponents

Player statistics

Season

Awards and records

Transactions

Trades

Subtractions

Player Transactions Citation:

References

External links

See also
 2001–02 NBA season

Chicago Bulls seasons
Chicago
Chicago
Chicago